Rasbora kluetensis is a species of cyprinid fish in the genus Rasbora. It is endemic to the  Kluet River basin in Sumatra.

References 

Rasboras
Freshwater fish of Sumatra
Taxa named by Daniel Lumbantobing
Fish described in 2010